"Tinker, Tenor, Doctor, Spy" is the 124th episode of the science fiction television series Star Trek: Voyager, the fourth episode of the sixth season. The title is a parody of the famous 1974 novel Tinker Tailor Soldier Spy by John le Carré.

In this EMH-centric episode the fictional USS Voyager spacecraft, lost on the wrong side of the Galaxy has a run in with some mysterious aliens.

The episode's story was written by the cartoonist Bill Vallely, and is noted for its comedic elements.

Plot
The Doctor (Robert Picardo) asks Captain Kathryn Janeway (Kate Mulgrew) to alter his program to allow him to captain the ship if an emergency occurs. Janeway refuses the request. Despite this, the Doctor alters his own sub-routines, allowing him to daydream, while Voyager is traveling through an apparently harmless nebula. Among other ego-fulfilling fantasies, the daydreams include one where he becomes the "Emergency Command Hologram" and defeats an attacking alien vessel using a fictional deadly photonic cannon. The Doctor finds that his daydreams are occurring when he doesn't want them to, a side effect of his faulty programming, and the crew disables the new routines.

Meanwhile, undetected by Voyager, the crew of an observation ship of the Hierarchy species has been monitoring Voyagers passage. As they have done with other ships that pass through the nebula, the Hierarchy determines whether there is any value on the ships, and if so, attacks them. Unable to scan Voyager via normal means, Hierarchy crewman Phlox instead uses a microscopic tunneling scan. This latches onto the Doctor's program, allowing him to witness events experienced by the hologram, but these are actually the Doctor's fantasies. Phlox soon realizes his mistake, which the Hierarchy will severely punish as soon as it becomes known. The attack on Voyager for its anti-matter reserves already has been scheduled, so Phlox needs it to fail.

Phlox uses the tunneling scan to reactivate the Doctor's daydreaming programs to allow him to communicate with the hologram. Phlox explains the situation to the Doctor, who in turn reports this to Janeway. As Voyagers crew becomes aware of the approaching Hierarchy ships, Janeway arranges for the deception to be complete, temporarily turning the Doctor into the Emergency Command Hologram. The Doctor, less confident in reality than his daydreams, is still able to bluff regarding use of the "photonic cannon" and the Hierarchy quickly retreats. Janeway commends the Doctor for his performance and arranges a team to evaluate the prospects of putting the hologram in charge of the ship under emergency situations.

Production
The episode was originally titled "The Secret Life of Neelix" and was intended to be a story about when Neelix's daydreams take on a life of their own when aliens become involved. However it was shifted around and rewritten to become a story involving the Doctor. The premise is based on the short story "The Secret Life of Walter Mitty" by James Thurber in which Walter Mitty daydreams heroic adventures while running an errand for his wife. The title of this episode is a reference to the 1974 spy novel Tinker, Tailor, Soldier, Spy by John le Carré.

Writer Joe Menosky describes the episode as "five days of scriptwriting paradise" because "the story itself becomes your friend and collaborator; it is rich enough to support you and keep feeding you ideas as you execute the script." During the writing of the script, Menosky asked actor Robert Picardo for "a list of what the Doctor's fantasies might be. Needless to say, a life drawing of Seven of Nine was the first suggestion [Picardo] made."

Actor Robert Picardo described the filming of the episode as "the most fun I've had in shooting the entire series ... It was great fun and one of our most successful outings at humor on our show."

Reception
The episode is a significant departure from typical Voyager episodes due to the story's extensive use of comedic elements, making it a favorite among many viewers. It has been cited as "most entertaining episode of the season to date, and a Voyager classic." In 2019, CBR ranked this the 15th best holodeck-themed episode of all Star Trek franchise episodes up to that time.

The Hollywood Reporter rated "Tinker, Tenor, Doctor, Spy" the 7th best episode of Star Trek: Voyager.

In 2009, Time rated "Tinker, Tenor, Doctor, Spy" as one of the top ten moments of Star Trek overall including film, and the only Star Trek: Voyager episode in their ranking.

In 2020, SyFy Wire ranked this episode the 11th best episode of Star Trek: Voyager.

Jammer's Reviews gave it 3.5 out of 4 stars and called it "A pleasant comic gem."

In 2020, ScreenRant said this was the ninth best episode of Star Trek: Voyager, based on IMDB rating of 8.6 out of 10.

Releases 
This episode was released as part of a season 6 DVD boxset on December 7, 2004.

Notes

References

Citations

Sources

Further reading

External links

 

Star Trek: Voyager (season 6) episodes
1999 American television episodes